Shailendra Khanal was Inspector General of Armed Police Force (Nepal). He served as 10th Inspector General of Armed Police Force (Nepal).

References

External links
 Armed Police Force, Nepal

Living people
Year of birth missing (living people)